Lily Hertha Kann 26th. October, 1893, Peitz – 2nd. November, 1978, Sussex, was a German-born, British actress.
(Though the BFI website claims that she was born in Berlin, and died in Horsham). She appeared in the West End in the play Background by Warren Chetham-Strode (1950).

Selected filmography
 The Flemish Farm (1943) as Farm Wife 
 Escape to Danger (1943) as Karin Möller
 Latin Quarter (1945) as Maria
 Woman to Woman (1947) as Concierge
 The Woman in the Hall (1947) as Baroness von Soll
 The White Unicorn (1947) as Shura
 Mrs. Fitzherbert (1947) as Queen Charlotte
 Now Barabbas (1949) as Woman 
 I Was a Male War Bride (1949) as Innkeeper's Wife (uncredited)
 The Third Man (1949) as Nurse (uncredited)
 The Clouded Yellow (1950) as Minna Cesare
 A Tale of Five Cities (1951) as Charlady  - (US: 'A Tale of Five Women')
 Flesh and Blood (1951) as Sister Maria (uncredited)
 Twice Upon a Time (1953) as Mrs. Muller
 Background (1953) as Brownie
 A Day to Remember (1953) as Grandmere
 Eight O'Clock Walk (1954) as Mrs. Zunz
 Twist of Fate (1954) as Nicole
 Betrayed (1954) as Jan's Grandmother
 A Kid for Two Farthings (1955) as Mrs. Kramm (uncredited)
 Foreign Intrigue (1956) as Blind Housekeeper
 Cat Girl (1957) as Anna, Brandts' Housekeeper
 Nowhere to Go (1958) as Anna Berg (uncredited)
 Whirlpool (1959) as Frau Steen
 No Trees in the Street (1959) as Mrs. Sarah Jacobson
 The House of the Seven Hawks (1959) as Gerta
 The Long Shadow (1961) as Old Lady
 Theatre 625 (1965) as Old Woman

References

External links

1893 births
1978 deaths
People from Spree-Neiße
People from the Province of Brandenburg
Jewish emigrants from Nazi Germany to the United Kingdom
British film actresses
British television actresses
German film actresses
German television actresses
20th-century British actresses
20th-century German women